Dimethylheptylpyran (DMHP, 3-(1,2-dimethylheptyl)-Δ6a(10a)-THC, 1,2-dimethylheptyl-Δ3-THC, A-40824, or EA-2233) is a synthetic analog of THC, which was invented in 1949 during attempts to elucidate the structure of Δ9-THC, one of the active components of Cannabis. DMHP is a pale yellow, viscous oil which is insoluble in water but dissolves in alcohol or non-polar solvents.

Effects
DMHP is similar in structure to THC, differing only in the position of one double bond, and the replacement of the 3-pentyl chain with a 3-(1,2-dimethylheptyl) chain. It produces similar activity to THC, such as sedative effects, but is considerably more potent, especially having much stronger analgesic and anticonvulsant effects than THC, although comparatively weaker psychological effects. It is thought to act as a CB1 agonist, in a similar manner to other cannabinoid derivatives. While DMHP itself has been subject to relatively little study since the characterization of the cannabinoid receptors, the structural isomer 1,2-dimethylheptyl-Δ8-THC has been shown to be a highly potent cannabinoid agonist, and the activity of its enantiomers has been studied separately.

Investigation as non-lethal incapacitating agent
DMHP and its O-acetate ester were extensively investigated by the US military chemical weapons program in the Edgewood Arsenal experiments, as possible non-lethal incapacitating agents.

DMHP has three stereocenters and consequently has eight possible stereoisomers, which differ considerably in potency. The mixture of all eight isomers of the O-acetyl ester was given the code number EA-2233, with the eight individual isomers numbered EA-2233-1 through EA-2233-8. The most potent isomer was EA-2233-2, with an active dose range in humans of 0.5–2.8 μg/kg (i.e. ~35–200 μg for a 70 kg adult). Active doses varied markedly between individuals, but when the dose of EA-2233 was taken up to 1–2  mg, all volunteers were considered to be incapable of performing military duties, with the effects lasting as long as 2–3 days.

DMHP is metabolized in a similar manner to THC, producing the active metabolite 11-hydroxy-DMHP, but the lipophilicity of DMHP is even higher than that of THC itself, giving it a long duration of action and an extended half-life in the body of between 20 and 39 hours, with the half-life of the 11-hydroxy-DMHP metabolite being longer than 48  hours.

DMHP and its esters produce sedation and mild hallucinogenic effects similar to large doses of THC, but in addition to this they also cause pronounced hypotension (low blood pressure) which occurs at doses well below the hallucinogenic dose, and can lead to severe dizziness, fainting, ataxia and muscle weakness, sufficient to make it difficult to stand upright or carry out any kind of vigorous physical activity. 

The acute toxicity of DMHP was found to be low in both human and animal studies, with the therapeutic index measured as a ratio of ED50 to LD50 in animals being around 2000 times; there have been no recorded deaths caused by any DMHP EA-2233 stereoisomers 1–8, only symptoms that are entirely consistent with highest-known levels of THC intoxication. DMHP has an intravenous LD50 of 63mg/kg in mice and an intravenous minimal lethal dose of 10mg/kg in dogs.

Unsuitability for military application 
The combination of strong incapacitating effects and a favorable safety margin led the Edgewood Arsenal team to conclude that DMHP and its derivatives, especially the O-acetyl ester of the most active isomer, EA-2233-2, were among the more promising non-lethal incapacitating agents to come out of their research program.

However, DMHP had the disadvantage of sometimes producing severe hypotension at pre-incapacitating doses, which did not occur with the more widely studied and publicized belladonnoid anticholinergic agents, such as 3-Quinuclidinyl benzilate (BZ), which was discovered and subsequently weaponized.  Military applications of synthetic cannabis were limited because the drug was both illegal and politically toxic to study via laboratory administration to enlisted servicemen. Both EA-2233-2 and the red-oil THC distillate predecessor (called EA-1476) both received limited budget and resources when compared to the study of other incapacitating agents of BZ derivatives and EA 1729 (LSD), which was widely believed at the time to be a viable mind-control and truth serum useful in a variety of Cold War applications. Initially, the 8 stereoisomers of EA-2233 could not be separated; later, two of the individual isomers of EA 2233 were isolated and tested, but were found to cause both orthostatic hypotension and minimal effects on performance at the very low doses used. EA 2233 did not seem to have sufficient potency to be of military interest, since an oral dose of 60mcg/kg caused a maximum decline of only 40% (at most) in performance at language and number processing tasks. A study was later published which showed that the oral effects of ordinary THC were only about one-third that of THC smoked as marijuana. The study suggests that the effectiveness of EA 2233 in an aerosol might be much greater than by the oral route, but this has never been independently verified using DMHP EA 2233. EA 2233 has never been used outside of the Edgewood Arsenal where it caused zero deaths in healthy volunteers from the military, but has been theorized to be able to pose a risk to those either very young, very old or possibly to cause loss of motor skills in those with pre-existing hypotension. In all cases, it was reported that after 72 hours the subjects showed no detectable residual effects, flashbacks, etc.

However, because DMHP was deemed to have an unsafe TI (Therapeutic Index) relative to BZ for use during military operations, its study was abandoned in favor of BZ.

Edgewood Arsenal & EA 2233 

The fiscal budgeting and planning for Edgewood Arsenal (established in 1948) was primarily a defensive research facility.  The US military, at the time, knew that the USSR was spending 10 times more than the USA on chemical weapons development. Edgewood initially enjoyed a mandate and lack of oversight. Edgewood Arsenal Chemical Corps was tasked with ensuring America was prepared with adequate counter-tactics and could mount its own psychochemical retaliatory strike if necessary. Edgewood performed analysis and submitted data to military commanders who could then choose to incorporate that into strategy (although, in practice, it was mostly to make the strategists aware of special weapons and tactics the enemy could deploy).

The Edgewood laboratory was originally founded in 1948. The original (precursor to EA 2233, called EA-1476) or "Red oil" known today as THC Delta-9 distillate was first created in 1949, and laboratory study of EA-1476 occurred in the mid-1950s.  A single batch of EA 2233 was prepared by chemist Harry Pars of A.D. Little Labs in 1962 under a top-secret government contract, and it was administered to groups of consenting & informed enlisted servicemen by Dr. James Ketchum in 1962.  The Edgewood laboratory was shut down in 1975. Government funding for continued military development of synthetic cannabis was lacking and the cannabinoid research program was indefinitely suspended along with the rest of the Edgewood Arsenal experiments in the late 1970s for a variety of mostly political reasons; there was growing public distrust of the military and government, and there was little useful purpose for the further development of chemical incapacitating agents during and after the Vietnam era.

The EA 2233 experiments were perhaps most harmful to the researchers' careers due to unfavorable press. Since the 1930s, cannabis, and cannabinoids had consistently been seen by the public as dangerous and addictive drugs. Thus, for straight-laced, law-abiding military strategists, DMHP was perhaps always the least attractive option, especially when compared to BZ. Although BZ was not cannabis, it was also viewed with a lack of imagination and utility among military planners, and was only tested once in a hastily constructed operation called "Project Dork" (part of Project 112).

Isomerism

Note that 6H-dibenzo[b,d]pyran-1-ol is the same as 6H-benzo[c]chromen-1-ol.

See also 
 Tetrahydrocannabinol
 Tetrahydrocannabiphorol
 Synthetic cannabinoids
 Effects of cannabis

References 

Benzochromenes
Cannabinoids
Incapacitating agents
Phenols
Designer drugs
Analgesics